İÇDAŞ, is a conglomerate in Turkey with businesses in construction, concrete production, energy, and mining services. Due to its coal-fired power stations it is one of the largest greenhouse gas emitters in Turkey. 

ICDAS Electric Production and Investment  A.Ş. owns the coal-fired İÇDAŞ Bekirli-1 and İÇDAŞ Bekirli-2 power stations.

Climate Trace estimates these coal-fired power plants emitted over 8 million tons of the country’s total 560 million tons of greenhouse gas in 2021.

References 

Conglomerate companies of Turkey
Holding companies of Turkey
Companies based in Istanbul
Coal companies of Turkey
Electric power companies of Turkey